DXSG (101.3 FM), broadcasting as 101.3 Radyo Natin, is a radio station owned and operated by Manila Broadcasting Company. Its studios and transmitter are located along Dela Cruz St., Brgy. Poblacion, Kiamba, Sarangani.

References

Radio stations established in 1997
Radyo Natin Network stations